The Kimberley Seventh-day Adventist Church is a provincial heritage site in Kimberley in the Northern Cape province of South Africa. It is part of the worldwide Seventh-day Adventist Church.

In 1967 it was described in the Government Gazette as

References
 South African Heritage Resource Agency database

Seventh-day Adventist churches
Churches in Kimberley, Northern Cape